Rhys Henry (born 8 September 1998) is a Welsh rugby union player, currently playing for Pro14 side Ospreys. His preferred position is prop.

Ospreys
Henry was named in the squad for Round 15 of the 2020–21 Pro14 in the match against . He made his debut in the same match as a replacement.

References

External links
itsrugby profile

Living people
1998 births
Welsh rugby union players
Ospreys (rugby union) players
Rugby union props